Yegoshikha was the 17th–18th-century settlement; predecessor of the modern city of Perm, Russia.

Yegoshikha may also refer to:
Yegoshikha Cemetery, the principal cemetery in the city of Perm, Russia
Yegoshikha (river), a river in Perm Krai, Russia